Five ships of the Royal Navy have been named HMS Dasher:

 was an 18-gun sloop launched in Bermuda in 1797. She became a convict hulk in 1832 and was broken up in 1838.
 was a wooden paddle packet launched in 1837 and sold in 1885.
 was a  torpedo boat destroyer launched in 1894 and sold in 1912.
 was an  launched in 1941. She was transferred to the Royal Navy under lend-lease in 1942 and was sunk in 1943.
 is an  launched in 1986 and currently in service.

Royal Navy ship names